Cladonia borealis, commonly known as the boreal cup lichen, is a species of lichen in the genus Cladonia.

Description 
Cladonia borealis is yellowish green to brown in color. It occurs in North and South America, Antarctica, Eurasia and many on islands. The ascoma, when present is apothecial.

Biochemistry 
Its secondary metabolites include 4-O-demethylbarbatic acid, barbatic acid, rhodocladonic acid and usnic acid.

See also 

 List of Cladonia species

References

External links
 
 North American Lichen Checklist
USDA Plants Database
List of British Lichens & Lichenicolous Fungi
 
 
 
 
 

Lichens described in 1989
borealis
Lichen species